Shanavas Shanu is an Indian television actor who is commonly known for playing Rudhran in Kumkumapoovu , Indran in Seetha.

Biography
Shanu was born in Manjeri, Malappuram. He studied at NNS College Malappuram. His mother's name is Mymoona. He has two younger sisters named Shanna and Jimsha Sheri. His father died at a very young age. He is married to Sona and has two children.

Career 
Shanu made his television debut in 2010, playing a lead role opposite to Nithya Das in Indraneelam. He rose to fame by playing villainous hero Rudhran in Kumkumapoovu and became a household name among the Malayali audience.

From 2017 to 2019, he played Indran in Seetha. His on-screen chemistry with Swasika created controversy among the younger audience. The pair were known as #Seethendriyam  on social networking sites.

In 2018, he debuted as a lead hero in a Malayalam film titled Police Junior, which won him the New Face award at the Adoor Bhasi awards in 2019. In 2019, he appeared in the television shows Alliyambal and Thamarathumbi.

He is also a prominent figure in television shows like Star Magic on Flowers TV and Thakarppan Comedy on Mazhavil Manorama.

Television works

Filmography

Filmography

Awards and nominations
Asianet Television Awards 2012 - Best Popular actor
Asiavision Awards - Best actor
Adoor Bhasi Awards 2013 - Best Actor
Thikkirushy Award 2013 - Best Actor
Johnson Master Memorial Award - Best Actor
Lohithadas Memorial Awards - Best Actor
NCP Awards 2019 - Best Actor
Adoor Bhasi Film awards 2019 - Best Debut
Mollywood Flick Awards 2021- Best On-Screen Pair

References

External links
 

Living people
Indian television actors
Male actors in Malayalam television
Year of birth missing (living people)